Ernesto Rodolfo Hintze Ribeiro (Ponta Delgada, Azores, 7 November 1849 – Lisbon, 1 August 1907) was a Portuguese politician, statesman, and nobleman from the Azores, who served as Prime Minister of Portugal three times, during King Carlos I's reign. 

A member of the Regenerator Party, Hintze Ribeiro's reforms in forestry, pharmacy, and autonomy for insular Portugal are the basis of these fields' policies today.

Career
He was a prominent parliamentarian and Peer of the Realm, Attorney-General of the Crown, Minister of Public Works, of Finance and Foreign Affairs as well as uncontested leader of the Regenerator Party, holding the position of President of the Council of Ministers (Prime Minister) thrice (22 February 1893 – 5 February 1897, 26 July 1900 – 20 October 1904 and 19 March 1906 – 19 May 1906).  

He was one of the dominant politicians of the final part of the Portuguese Constitutional Monarchy, occupying the post of Prime Minister longer than any other in his time.  He was responsible for important reforms - some of which are still valid - such as the insular autonomy for the Azores and Madeira islands (1895), the pharmacies' law, and forest's law (1901).

He was made effective Councillor of State in 1891, received many decorations, among them the Great-Cross of the Order of the Tower and Sword.  He was associate of the Royal Academy of Sciences.

A street in Ponta Delgada has been named in his honor.

References

1849 births
1907 deaths
Portuguese people of German descent
People from Ponta Delgada
Regenerator Party politicians
Prime Ministers of Portugal
Finance ministers of Portugal